Rangsan Roobmoh is a Thai retired footballer.

Roobmoh has previously played for Pattaya United in Thai Premier League.

References
Profile at Thaipremierleague.co.th
Profile at Thai Soccer Net
Rangsan Roobmoh`s Facebookpage

1982 births
Living people
Rangsan Roobmoh
Rangsan Roobmoh
Rangsan Roobmoh
Rangsan Roobmoh
Rangsan Roobmoh
Rangsan Roobmoh
Association football forwards